The Tan Kim Seng Fountain is a fountain in Singapore that was erected in 1882 in honor of notable philanthropist Tan Kim Seng for his donations for the Singapore's first reservoir and waterworks.

History
The erection of the Tan Kim Seng Fountain by the British Colonial Government was in response to Tan's donation of $130,050 to the government for the construction of Singapore's Castle. The Tan Kim Seng Fountain was erected by the Municipal Commissioners to commemorate Tan's donation. However, his donation was squandered away by the Government Engineer, who hoped to make water run uphill through water pipes. In 1882, possibly out of shame and to mark the British colonial government's appreciation, the fountain was installed at Fullerton Square to perpetuate his name, where it would grace the busy traffic intersection for four decades.

The fountain was made by Andrew Handyside and Company from England, and officially unveiled on 19 May 1882. The fountain was moved to Battery Road in 1905 and later in 1925 to the Esplanade, while the Fullerton Building was being constructed, where it currently stands. In January 1994, it was shut down for repairs that lasted seven months. As part of this S$1.12-million restoration project, the 7m-high cast-iron fountain was also rust-proofed and a new foundation was built. On 28 December 2010, the Tan Kim Seng Fountain was gazetted as a national monument. It currently sits alongside other monuments such as the Lim Bo Seng Memorial and Cenotaph at the Esplanade Park.

Design and appearance
The Victorian-style iron fountain has three tiers and is decorated with classical figures. The exquisite fountain features four Muses – Greek goddesses of science, literature, and the arts – in its lower bowl, each bearing an object of her patronage. Calliope, the Muse of Epic Poetry, carries a writing tablet; Clio, the Muse of History, carries a scroll; Erato, the Muse of Lyric Poetry, carries a lyre; and Melpomene, the Muse of Tragedy, carries a wreath. Beneath the sculptures of the Muses are four faces of Poseidon, the God of the Sea according to Greek mythology, each spouting water. The fountain bears close resemblance to the Carriedo Fountain in Manila, which also dates from 1882, and was possibly manufactured by the same founder.

See also
National monuments of Singapore
Queen Elizabeth Walk

References

External links
NLB.GOV.SG

National monuments of Singapore
Monuments and memorials in Singapore
Downtown Core (Singapore)
Buildings and structures completed in 1882
Landmarks in Singapore
Hokkien place names
Outdoor sculptures in Singapore
Public art in Singapore
19th-century architecture in Singapore